Zilla Parishad Raigad or District Council Raigad is a district council having jurisdiction over Raigad district in Maharashtra, India.

List of Council Chairman of Raigad

Panchayat Samiti
Currently there are seven Panchayat Samiti under jurisdiction Zilla Parishad Raigad .

List

 Panchayat Samiti Alibag
 Panchayat Samiti Panvel
 Panchayat Samiti Murud
 Panchayat Samiti pen
 Panchayat Samiti Uran
 Panchayat Samiti Karjat
 Panchayat Samiti Khalapur
 Panchayat Samiti Mangaon
 Panchayat Samiti Roha
 Panchayat Samiti Sudhagad
 Panchayat Samiti Tala
 Panchayat Samiti Mahad
 Panchayat Samiti Mhasala
 Panchayat Samiti Shrivardhan
 Panchayat Samiti Poladpur

References

Local government in Maharashtra
Raigad district